The 1995–96 EHF Champions League was the 36th edition of Europe's premier club handball tournament.

Knockout stage

Preliminary round

|}

Round of 32

|}

Round of 16

|}

Group stage

Group A

Group B

Knockout stage

Finals

|}

References

External links 
 EHF Champions League website

EHF Champions League seasons
Champions League
Champions League